Anjirang station is a station of Daegu Subway Line 1 in Nam-gu, Daegu, South Korea.

Number of passengers by year
1997: 3036
1998: 3320
1999: 3390
2000: Undisclosed
2001: 3247
2002: 3435
2003: 1910
2004: 3301
2005: 3396
2006: 4095
2007: 3952
2008: 3907
2009: 3907

References

External links

 Cyber station information from Daegu Metropolitan Transit Corporation

Buildings and structures in Daegu
Daegu Metro stations